The Bob Bondurant School of High Performance Driving was an American performance driving school, specializing in instruction for high performance driving, teen defensive driving, law enforcement and special forces driving, open wheel race car training, Grand Prix road racing, drag racing, go karts, and other courses using the copyrighted Bondurant Method. It was formerly located in Chandler, Arizona at the Wild Horse Pass Motorsports Park.

 In 1968, it was originally located at Orange County International Raceway in California, later moving to Ontario Motor Speedway in 1970, and to Sears Point International Raceway in 1973. In 1990 a purpose-built training facility was opened in Chandler, Arizona.

The Bob Bondurant School of High Performance Driving was the largest purpose-built driving school in the world. It featured a 15-turn, 1.6-mile road course, an eight-acre asphalt pad for advanced training with more than 100 race-prepared vehicles, sedans, and open-wheel cars.  Bob Bondurant's copyrighted method taught competition driving, police pursuit driving, evasive driving for chauffeurs and bodyguards, stunt driving, and other courses.

History
The Bob Bondurant School of High Performance Driving was initially opened by World Champion and ten time hall of fame inductee Bob Bondurant at the Orange County International Raceway near Los Angeles, CA under the Bob Bondurant School of High Performance Driving name. He initially approached Porsche for backing, but was temporarily declined due to the uncertainty of this being a new school. Bob then approached Datsun, which immediately agreed to support his plans. The starting lineup of cars included Datsun 240Zs, 510s, 2000 convertibles, a Lola T70 Can-Am car, and a Formula Vee. By 1970, the school relocated to the nearby Ontario Motor Speedway. Porsche, after witnessing how the school increased Datsun's profile, supplied Bondurant with Porsche 911s and Porsche 914s. In 1973, Bob moved his already famous school to the track he purchased, Sears Point International Raceway (now Infineon Raceway) near Sonoma, CA in 1973.

In 1976, the President of Ford Motor Company convinced Bob to no longer use the Datsun's since he won the World Championship in cars powered by Ford. He offered Bob a full Ford sponsorship of cars, parts, and marketing until 2003.

In 1989, Bob was invited to Firebird Raceway in Chandler, AZ to consider a lease agreement to build the world's first purpose-built driver training facility. The land limitations only allowed Bob to put the small version of his dream training facility in Chandler, Arizona at Firebird Raceway, now known as Wild Horse Pass Motorsports Park.

In late 2018, Bob Bondurant and wife Pat, found themselves embroiled in an unfortunate and unforeseen family business situation where they were victimized as a result of a power struggle and attempted character assaults perpetrated by certain close family members looking to take over the company.

Within 5 months, enough financial and infrastructural damage had taken place to force the legendary racing school into Chapter 11 protection. As a result, the school’s assets, not the Bondurant name, were sold off in 2019.

The current operators of the formerly leased facility have renamed the facility and has no affiliation with Bob Bondurant or the Bob Bondurant School of High Performance Driving/ Bondurant Racing School.

The Bob Bondurant School of High Performance Driving has graduated over 500,000 drivers since its opening in 1968. Many NASCAR drivers were trained at Bob's school for road course training, along with many celebrity actors for driving scenes. Paul Newman and Robert Wagner were the third and fourth students to enroll in the Bob Bondurant School of High Performance Driving for the movie "Winning".

The famous Bondurant name has never been bought or sold. Pat and Bob Bondurant intend to reopen their school under an all-new ownership and management structure, at an exciting new location, and are currently negotiating opportunities to purchase the Bondurant Trademark License Rights.

References

External links 
 Bondurant Racing School

Educational institutions established in 1968
Racing schools